Sekmai is a village in the Imphal West district in the Indian state of Manipur.

See also
Phayeng

References

Imphal West district